Gabbin is a small town in the Wheatbelt region of Western Australia.

The townsite originally served as a railway station for the Wyalkatchem to Mount Marshall line that was constructed through the area in 1913. 
The townsite was gazetted in 1918 and was named after the railway station.

In 1932 the Wheat Pool of Western Australia announced that the town would have two grain elevators, each fitted with an engine, installed at the railway siding. Work on the bulk handling depot commenced late in 1933.

References 

Wheatbelt (Western Australia)